Flavin-containing monooxygenase 3 (FMO3), also known as dimethylaniline monooxygenase [N-oxide-forming] 3 and trimethylamine monooxygenase, is a flavoprotein enzyme that in humans is encoded by the FMO3 gene.
This enzyme catalyzes the following chemical reaction, among others:

trimethylamine + NADPH + H+ + O2  trimethylamine N-oxide + NADP+ + H2O

FMO3 is the main flavin-containing monooxygenase isoenzyme that is expressed in the liver of adult humans.

FMO3 is the primary enzyme in humans which catalyzes the N-oxidation of trimethylamine into trimethylamine N-oxide; FMO1 also does this, but to a much lesser extent than FMO3. Genetic deficiencies of the FMO3 enzyme cause primary trimethylaminuria, also known as "fish odor syndrome". FMO3 is also involved in the metabolism of many xenobiotics (i.e., exogenous compounds which are not normally present in the body), such as the oxidative deamination of amphetamine.

Ligands

Cancer 
FMO3 gene has been observed progressively downregulated in Human papillomavirus-positive neoplastic keratinocytes derived from uterine cervical preneoplastic lesions at different levels of malignancy. For this reason, FMO3 is likely to be associated with tumorigenesis and may be a potential prognostic marker for uterine cervical preneoplastic lesions progression.

See also
Flavin-containing monooxygenase
Trimethylaminuria

References

Further reading

External links
 
 Primary Trimethylaminuria (FMO3 Deficiency) – NCBI bookshelf GeneReviews entry

Amphetamine
Flavoproteins